is a 1992 Japanese film directed by Takashi Miike. This is the first of many Miike films to be based on manga, in this case one by Ikki Kajiwara.

Cast
Megumi Kudo
Yoshika Maedomari
Hisao Maki as Teacher Omoto (voice)
Chika Matsui
Daisuke Nagekura as Jin
Atsushi Onita as himself
Eisaku Shindō
Combat Toyoda

References

External links 
 

1992 films
1990s action films
Live-action films based on manga
Films directed by Takashi Miike
Japanese direct-to-video films
V-Cinema
1990s Japanese films